Eric Garcia (born October 5, 1994) is an American professional basketball player who currently plays for Soles de Mexicali of the LNBP. He played college basketball at Wofford College.

College career
Garcia played for the Wofford Terriers from 2013 to 2017. In 33 games during his senior year, he averaged 14.0 points and 6.9 assists, and was sixth nationally in free-throw percentage at 92.1.

Professional career
After graduating, Garcia had a workout with the Denver Nuggets in May 2017. On July 26, 2017, Garcia signed with the Adriatic League's MZT Skopje. He made his debut for the MZT Skopje in their season opener on September 29, 2017, scoring 17 points, two rebounds, nine assists and one steal in a 92–89 win over the Partizan. On November 22, 2017, he parted ways with MZT Skopje after averaging 11.1 points, 2.1 rebounds and 6.1 assists per game in the ABA League. 
On February 20, 2018, he signed with Kataja. In 2019 he is playing for Soles de Mexicali.

References

External links
Eurobasket.com Profile
RealGM Profile
Wofford Terriers bio
ESPN Profile
Sports-reference Profile

1994 births
Living people
ABA League players
American expatriate basketball people in North Macedonia
Basketball players from Colorado
KK MZT Skopje players
Point guards
Sportspeople from Aurora, Colorado
Wofford Terriers men's basketball players
American men's basketball players
Soles de Mexicali players